Kharachevo is a rural locality (a settlement) in Podlesnoye Rural Settlement, Vologodsky District, Vologda Oblast, Russia. The population was 745 as of 2002. There are 11 streets.

Geography 
Kharachevo is located 10 km southeast of Vologda (the district's administrative centre) by road. Babikovo is the nearest rural locality.

References 

Rural localities in Vologodsky District